Computer-generated choreography is the technique of using algorithms to create dance. It is commonly described as using computers for choreographing dances, creating computer animations, studying or teaching aspects of human movement, illustrating dance movements, or assistance in notating dances. It may also be applied in terms of choreographic software for stimulation, enabling real-time choreography and generative dance, or simulation with virtual dancers in the field of Dance technology. Historically, computers and dance can be traced back to the 1960s, for example, Michael Noll wrote an article about his work, titled "Choreography and Computers", published in Dance Magazine in 1967.

Multiple projects have worked with computers and choreography to create movement materials, choreographic scores, and other digital outcomes, for example:
 Merce Cunningham used the software Lifeforms by Credo Interactive (later Danceforms) to create dance works, starting in the 1990s with Thecla Schiphorst.
 ChoreoGraph was a software tool from 1998 by choreographer Michael Klien and programmer Nick Rothwell. It was used to generate the score for the work Nodding Dog for the Volksoper Vienna as well as Duplex in 2001 and Einem in 2002 for Ballett Frankfurt, ZKM and Tanzquatier Wien.
 Improvisation Technologies was a CD-Rom by William Forsythe and Christian Ziegler, Produced at ZKM Karlsruhe in 1999 Starting as a way to document his processes for Ballet Frankfort, Forsythe developed this digital tool for analyzing movement.
 Software for Dancers was a UK-based project led by Scott deLahunta in 2002. Manifesting as a think tank, the project organized several workshops and symposia that explored rehearsal tools in the form of digital dance sketchbooks, performance tools, and documentation of dance.
 Synchronous Objects uses the score of the Forsythe work One Flat Thing, reproduced (2000), to create data and transform the dance into choreographic objects. These objects include digital components such as the Counterpoint Tool.
 Wayne McGregor has worked with the Choreographic Language Agent, an AI agent used to augment his process since 2004. The most recent iteration of this was Becoming a tool developed with Marc Downie and Nick Rothwell. The aim is to provoke new movement creation in the studio.
 Choreographic Coding Lab is a touring laboratory looking to explore connections of the data generated during dance and choreography with coding.
 Kate Sicchio joins the fields of computer-generated choreography and Live coding, through her projects Hacking Choreography (2012) and Hacking Choreography 2.0 (2014).
 Analogues to computer-generated choreography can be seen in traditional dance such as the Maypole dancing.
 Google releases a deep learning based AI Choreographer (2021) which outperforms previous state-of-the-art methods, both qualitatively and quantitatively in generating realistic and captivating dance sequences.

References

Choreography
Algorithmic art